The Moorten Botanical Garden and Cactarium is a  family-owned botanical garden in Palm Springs, California, specializing in cacti and other desert plants. The gardens lie within Riverside County's Coachella Valley, part of the Colorado Desert ecosystem.

History
The Moorten Gardens were established as a nursery in 1939 by Patricia and Chester "Cactus Slim" Moorten, and developed into the present day garden in 1955. Chester, one of the original Keystone Cops, starred in Two Flaming Youths (1927) and The Sideshow (1928).  The Moorten residence was named the Cactus Castle, and was originally built in Mediterranean style by photographer Stephen H. Willard (1894–1966). The Moortens collected many of their own specimen plants from Baja California, mainland Mexico, and as far south as Guatemala. To recognize their contributions to the community, the Moortens were awarded "Golden Palm Stars" on the Palm Springs Walk of Stars.

Collections

Ecoregion habitats 
The garden includes 3,000 examples of desert cacti and other desert plants, grouped by geographic regions:
 Arizona – Sonoran and Yuma Deserts
 Baja California Peninsula
 California – High Desert–Mojave Desert and Low Desert–Colorado and Yuha Deserts
 Colorado Plateau – Great Basin Desert
 Sonora, Mexico – Gran Desierto de Altar
 South Africa – Succulent Karoo
 South America – Monte and Patagonian Deserts
 Texas – Chihuahuan Desert

Garden collections 
Outdoor collections include: Agaves, Bombax, crested Cereus, Cardoon and Boojum trees, "arborescent candelabra Euphorbia" , a two-story Pachypodium, thorned Caesalpinia and Bursera, and over a dozen Aloes of southern Africa and Madagascar.

"Cactarium" greenhouse collections include: cacti and succulents, with caudiciform species exhibiting thickened root crowns, many species of Asclepiads, Aztecia, Gymnocalycium, Alstromeria, Euphorbia, and Ferocactus, plus two fine examples of Welwitschia mirabilis from Namibian deserts.

See also
 Living Desert Zoo and Gardens
 List of botanical gardens in the United States

References

Further reading
  
  (here for Table of Contents)

External links
 
  – With commentary by Frank Bogert; starts at the McCallum Adobe Museum and ends at the botanical garden.

Botanical gardens in California
Flora of the Sonoran Deserts
North American desert flora
Flora of the Southwestern United States
Gardens in Riverside County, California
Colorado Desert
Coachella Valley
Tourist attractions in Palm Springs, California
Cactus gardens